John Beresford, 2nd Baron Decies (20 January 1774 – 1 March 1865) was an Irish peer and clergyman. His father, the 1st Baron Decies was son of Marcus Beresford, 1st Earl of Tyrone and Catherine de Poer, Countess of Tyrone.

Early life
Beresford was born on 20 January 1774. He was the second son of nine children born to William Beresford, 1st Baron Decies, and Elizabeth FitzGibbon. Through his brother, the Rev. George Beresford, he was an uncle to British Army officer Marcus Beresford, MP for Northallerton and Berwick-upon-Tweed, and through his sister Louisa (through her marriage to Thomas Hope), he was an uncle to Henry Thomas Hope, MP, and Alexander Beresford Hope, MP. Louisa later married their first cousin, William Beresford, 1st Viscount Beresford.

His maternal grandparents were John FitzGibbon and wife Isabella ( Grove) FitzGibbon and his uncle was John FitzGibbon, 1st Earl of Clare. His paternal grandparents were Marcus Beresford, 1st Earl of Tyrone and Lady Catharine Power (only daughter of James Power, 3rd Earl of Tyrone and 3rd Viscount Decies). Among his extended family were uncles George Beresford, 1st Marquess of Waterford and John Beresford, MP for Waterford, and aunts Catherine Beresford (wife of Thomas Christmas MP and Theophilus Jones MP), Frances Beresford (wife of Henry Flood), and Eliza Beresford (wife of Col. Thomas Cobbe MP, son of Charles Cobbe, Archbishop of Dublin).

He was educated at Emmanuel College, Cambridge University.

Career
A clergyman in the Church of Ireland, he served as Rector of Tuam while his father was the Archbishop of Tuam from 1794 to 1819.

Upon his father's death on 6 September 1819, he succeeded as the 2nd Baron Decies as his elder brother, Brig.-Gen. Marcus Beresford had died unmarried in 1804.

Personal life

On 26 July 1810, Beresford was married to Charlotte Philadelphia Horsley, the only daughter and heiress of the former Ellen Mary Kerr (a daughter of Andrew Seton Kerr) and Robert Horsley of Bolam House, Northumberland. Bolam House was built by Charlotte's father using stone from the ruined ancient castle on the estate which had been purchased in 1727 by his father, John Horsley. Following his marriage, he adopted the additional surname of Horsley in accordance with the terms of his wife's inheritance. Together, they were the parents of one son and three daughters:

 William Robert John Horsley-Beresford, 3rd Baron Decies (1811–1893), who married Catharine Anne Dent, the second daughter of Cmdr. William Dent of Shortflatt Tower.
 Hon. Georgiana Catherine Horsley-Beresford (b. 1812), who married William Watson and, later, Henry Edward Brown in 1845.
 Hon. Louisa Elizabeth Horsley-Beresford (1814–1891), who married Ernest Brudenell-Bruce, 3rd Marquess of Ailesbury, in 1834.
 Hon. Caroline Agnes Beresford, Duchess of Montrose (1818–1894), who married James Graham, 4th Duke of Montrose in 1836. After his death in 1874, she married William Stuart Stirling-Crawfurd in 1876. After his death in 1883, she married, her second cousin twice removed, Marcus Henry Milner, third son of Henry Beilby William Milner and Charlotte Henrietta Beresford (second daughter of Most Rev. Marcus Gervais Beresford, Archbishop of Armagh), in 1888.

Lady Decies died on 9 March 1852. Lord Decies died on 1 March 1865 and was succeeded in the barony by his son William.

Descendants
Through his only son and principal heir John, he was a grandfather of Caroline Catherine Horsley-Beresford (wife of Col. George Alexander Eason Wilkinson) William Marcus de la Poer Horsley-Beresford, 4th Baron Decies, John Graham Hope Horsley de la Poer Beresford, 5th Baron Decies, Hon. Seton Robert de la Poer Horsley-Beresford (who married actress Delia Dorothy O'Sullivan and Joan Rosemary Graves-Sawle), Hon. Catherine Elizabeth Ellen Horsley-Beresford (wife of Lt.-Col. Edward J. M. Lumb), Hon. Charlotte Ernestine Horsley-Beresford (wife of Maj. Cameron Barclay), Hon. Henry William Walter Horsley-Beresford (who married Constance ( Blades) Levenston), and Hon. William Arthur de la Poer Horsley-Beresford (who married four times).

Through his daughter Louisa, he was grandfather to seven, including Lady Louisa Caroline Brudenell-Bruce (wife of Sir Henry Meux, 2nd Baronet), Lady Ernestine Mary Brudenell-Bruce (wife of William Hare, 3rd Earl of Listowel), Lt. George John Brudenell-Bruce (who married Lady Evelyn Mary Craven, daughter of the 2nd Earl of Craven), James Ernest Brudenell-Bruce, Henry Augustus Brudenell-Bruce, 5th Marquess of Ailesbury, Lord Robert Thomas Brudenell-Bruce (who married Emma Leigh), and Maj. Lord Charles Frederick Brudenell-Bruce (who married Margaret Renshaw).

Through his youngest daughter's first marriage, he was a grandfather of Douglas Graham, 5th Duke of Montrose, Lady Agnes Caroline Graham (wife of Lt. Col. John Murray), Lady Beatrice Violet Graham (wife of Algernon Greville, 2nd Baron Greville), and Lady Alma Imogen Leonora Carlotta Graham (wife of Gavin Campbell, 1st Marquess of Breadalbane).

References 
Notes

Sources

1774 births
1865 deaths
19th-century Anglo-Irish people
Barons in the Peerage of Ireland
John
Ordained peers